Calymnidae is a family of echinoderms belonging to the order Holasteroida.

Genera:
 Calymne Thomson, 1877
 Chelonechinus Bather, 1934
 Pseudoffaster Lambert, 1924
 Sternopatagus de Meijere, 1903

References

Holasteroida
Echinoderm families